Başkent can refer to:

 Başkent, Aziziye
 Başkent University
 Başkent Yıldızları
 Başkent Volleyball Hall
 Başkent University Medical and Research Center of Alanya